Dongjakdaegyo is a bridge over the Han River in Seoul, South Korea.  It carries road traffic and Seoul Subway Line 4, and Dongjak Station is located at the southern end of this bridge. It is a blue truss bridge.  It is the 11th bridge overall, and the fifth railroad bridge to be completed across the Han River.  Dongjakdaegyo was completed on the same day as Donghodaegyo, which has a similar structure.

History
Construction on Dongjakdaegyo commenced on October 18, 1978, and Seoul Mayor Jachoon Gu, Deputy Prime Minister Deokwoo Nam, and Minister of Construction Hyeongshik Shin participated in the groundbreaking ceremony.  At the time of commencing construction, Dongjakdaegyo was the first bridge in Korea to have the langer-arch design, and was scheduled to open in September 1981.  The reason for using the langer-arch design for this bridge was because a steel plate was used instead of a concrete plate for reducing the bridge weight by designing to allow the Seoul Line No. 4 to pass.  At the time, the construction of Dongjakdaegyo was carried out as construction of a civil investment method by the investment and construction delegated to Daewoo Development, similar to Wonhyo Daegyo, therefore there was a plan to receive toll fares for a period of 20 years.  At the time of construction, Dongjakdaegyo was the widest bridge in Korea.

October 18, 1978: Construction started
February 1980: Construction completion time extended to December 1981
1981: Construction suspended due to Daewoo Construction returning the construction project
February 1982: Construction resumed
December 1983: Construction completion time extended to the end of 1984
February 1984: Announcement of plan to open in September with only six vehicle lanes
November 14, 1984: Completed and opened

References

Bridges in Seoul
Bridges completed in 1984
Bridges over the Han River (Korea)
Rapid transit bridges
Road-rail bridges
Seoul Subway Line 4